Robert W. Loughery (February 2, 1820 – 1894) was a 19th-century United States newspaper publisher and editor who worked for or owned newspapers in Louisiana and Texas.

All of his papers were published in major cities of both states and included Galveston, Texas, Jefferson, Texas, Marshall, Texas, Monroe, Louisiana, and Shreveport, Louisiana. Two of his Marshall newspapers the Texas Republican and the Tri-Weekly Herald were credited with aiding the election of Marshall citizens, J.P. Henderson, Edward Clark, and Pendleton Murrah to the Governor's office and Louis T. Wigfall to the U.S. Senate. Loughery often defended slavery and plantation agriculture in his papers; and supported secession and later the Confederacy. He supported reconciliation with the Union and acceptance of defeat of the Confederacy in the Civil War until congress approved Reconstruction.

External links
 

1820 births
1894 deaths
People from Marshall, Texas
People of Texas in the American Civil War
People of Louisiana in the American Civil War
19th-century American journalists
American male journalists
19th-century American male writers
Journalists from Texas